Kevin Bradley Call (born November 13, 1961 in Boulder, Colorado) is a former American football tackle who played ten seasons in the National Football League for the Indianapolis Colts. He played college football at Colorado State.

Call was a starter on the offensive line for all four of his seasons at Colorado State University. He was inducted into the Colorado State University Athletics Hall of Fame in 1999.

External links
 Colorado State Athletics Hall of Fame bio

1961 births
Living people
Sportspeople from Boulder, Colorado
Players of American football from Colorado
American football offensive tackles
Colorado State Rams football players
Indianapolis Colts players
Ed Block Courage Award recipients